Herminio Hidalgo (born 30 March 1962) is a Panamanian wrestler. He competed in two events at the 1988 Summer Olympics.

References

1962 births
Living people
Panamanian male sport wrestlers
Olympic wrestlers of Panama
Wrestlers at the 1988 Summer Olympics
Place of birth missing (living people)
Pan American Games medalists in wrestling
Pan American Games silver medalists for Panama
Wrestlers at the 1987 Pan American Games
20th-century Panamanian people
21st-century Panamanian people